Kilomètre zéro (Sorani Kurdish: کیلۆمەتری سفر) is a 2005 film written, produced, and directed by the Kurdish director Hiner Saleem. Kilometre Zero is the first Iraqi film chosen for the official Cannes competition.

Plot
The story begins with a road trip story set in Iraqi Kurdistan during the Iran–Iraq War in 1988. The radio announcer is describing the events happening.

The scene then switches to a Kurdish village a few weeks before the Halabja poison gas attack where Ako, a young Kurdish man, is forced to join the Iraqi Army, while he is dreaming of escaping the country. A few dramatic scenes follow, some of them being flashbacks of home. Ako is sent to the frontline with a few Kurdish comrades and is subject to abuse by the other Iraqi soldiers, due to his Kurdish background.

There are other scenes depicting abuse also. In one, a man is beaten for refusing to run laps with the others. In another, a firing squad is seen in executing captured Kurdish guerillas.

When Ako is given a mission to escort the coffin of a dead Iraqi soldier to his family, an unexpected opportunity for escaping comes up. His driver turns out to be an Arab with strong feeling against the Kurds. They are given a small car with the coffin draped in an Iraqi flag, strapped to the top. The two set out for the long journey across the Iraqi landscape, and encounter a few happenings along the way. In one, they are confronted by a screaming Iraqi woman who is convinced that the dead soldier is her husband. In another, the two men are sitting together as they take a break, and the driver refuses to let Ako look at a picture of his wife.

As the journey goes on, Ako does his best to trick the driver into heading toward Kurdistan. He eventually finds his village, now destroyed and abandoned. However, he finds his wife, but their reunion is cut short by an Iraqi bombardment.

The setting switches to Ako and his wife in 2003. They discuss how much they lost during the war, and hear the news that Baghdad has fallen to Coalition troops. They are overjoyed, and celebrate their newfound freedom.

Cast
 Nazmi Kirik 
 Eyam Ekrem
 Belçim Bilgin
 Ehmed Qeladizeni
 Nezar Selami

References

External links
 Hiner Saleem presenting Kilometre Zero in Stockholm- Kamera / Redigering : Gurgin Bakircioglu (YOUTUBE)
 
 

2005 films
2005 drama films
Iraqi drama films
Kurdish films
Kurdish-language films
2000s Arabic-language films
French drama films
2000s French-language films
2005 multilingual films
French multilingual films
2000s French films